Leslie Donald Bennett (10 January 1918 – 29 April 1999) was an English professional footballer who played as an inside forward for Tottenham Hotspur and West Ham United.

Football career
Bennett joined Tottenham as a junior in May 1939. He spent much of the Second World War years serving his country with the Devon Regiment in Burma, India and Egypt, before making his Football League debut against Birmingham City on 31 August 1946. The quick- thinking, energetic inside forward was an important part of the push and run side of the 1950s. He made 294 appearances and scored on 124 occasions in all competitions for the club between 1946 and 1954. Bennett transferred to West Ham in December 1954 playing another 26 matches and scoring three goals. In August 1956 he became player–coach for Clacton before finishing his football career at Romford in 1959–60.

Honours 
Tottenham Hotspur
 Football League Second Division winner: 1949–50
 Football League First Division winner: 1950–51
  Football League First Division runner-up: 1951–52

Post-football career 
Bennett managed a caravan site in Clacton and was employed as a security guard at the University of Essex before retiring. He came out of retirement in 1964 to play in a "Push and Run" XI for the John White memorial fund.

References

External links
Tottenham Hotspur F.C A-Z of players Retrieved 29 November 2012 

Guardian newspaper obituary Retrieved 13 May 2009

1918 births
1999 deaths
Footballers from Wood Green
English footballers
Association football inside forwards
Tottenham Hotspur F.C. players
West Ham United F.C. players
Romford F.C. players
Military personnel from Middlesex
F.C. Clacton players
English Football League players
English football managers
F.C. Clacton managers
British Army personnel of World War II
Devonshire Regiment soldiers